The Roman Catholic Diocese of Langres (Latin: Dioecesis Lingonensis; French: Diocèse de Langres) is a Roman Catholic diocese comprising the département of Haute-Marne in France.
 
The diocese is now a suffragan in ecclesiastical province of the Archdiocese of Reims, having been a suffragan of Lyon until 2002. The current bishop is Joseph Marie Edouard de Metz-Noblat, who succeeded Bishop  Philippe Jean Marie Joseph Gueneley on 21 January 2014. The diocese covers a territory of 6,250 km2  and its estimated catholic population is 140,000.

History 
Louis Duchesne considers Senator, Justus and St. Desiderius (Didier), who was martyred during the invasion of the Vandals (about 407), the first three bishops of Langres. The See, therefore, must have been founded about the middle of the fourth century.

In 1179, Hugh III, Duke of Burgundy gave the city of Langres to his uncle, Gautier of Burgundy, then bishop, making him a prince-bishop. Later, Langres was made a duchy, which gave the Duke-Bishop of Langres the right of secular precedence over his Metropolitan, the Archbishop of Lyon, at the consecration of the kings of France.

The chief patron saint of the diocese is the martyr Saint Mammes of Caesarea (third century), to whom the cathedral, a beautiful monument of the late twelfth century, is dedicated. The diocese of Langres honors as saints some martyrs who, according to St. Benignus legend, died in the persecution of Roman Emperor Marcus Aurelius. They are the triplets Saints Speusippus, Eleusippus, and Melapsippus; St. Neo, the author of their Acts; St. Leonilla, their grandmother; and St. Junilla, their mother. Other saints include St. Valerius (Valier), a disciple of St. Desiderius, who was martyred by the Vandals in the fifth century; the hermit St. Godo (Saint Gou), nephew of St. Vandrillus in the seventh century. St. Gengulphus, martyr in the eighth century; Venerable Gerard Voinchet (1640–95), canon regular of the Congregation of St. Geneviève in Paris; Venerable Jeanne Mance (1606–73); Venerable Mariet, a priest who died in 1704; and Venerable Joseph Urban Hanipaux, a Jesuit. The latter three were natives of the diocese and celebrated for their apostolic labors in Canada.

The diocese was also the birthplace of the theologian Nicolas de Clémenges (fourteenth or fifteenth century), who was canon and treasurer of the Church of Langres; of the Gallican canonist Edmond Richer (1560–1631); of the Jesuit Pierre Lemoine, author of an epic poem on St. Louis and of the work "La dévotion aisée" (1602–71); and of the philosopher Diderot (1713–84). The historian Raoul Glaber, monk of Cluny Abbey who died in 1050, was at the priory of St. Léger in this diocese when he was touched by Divine grace on the occasion of an apparition.

The Benedictine Poulangy Abbey was founded in the eleventh century. Morimond Abbey, the fourth foundation of Cîteaux, was established in 1125 by Odolric, lord of Aigremont, and Simon, Count of Bassigny. The Augustinian priory of the Val des Ecoliers was founded in 1212 at Luzy, near Chaumont, by four doctors of the Paris University who were led into solitude by a love of retreat.

Blessed Otho, son of Leopold of Austria and Abbot of Morimond became Bishop of Freising in Bavaria and returned in 1154 to die a simple monk in Morimond.

The "Scourging of the Alleluia," now no longer observed, was quite celebrated in this diocese in the Middle Ages. On the day when, according to tradition, the Alleluia was omitted from the liturgy, a top on which the word "Alleluia" was written was whipped out of the church, to the singing of psalms by the choirboys, who wished it bon voyage till Easter.

The "Pardon of Chaumont" is very celebrated. In 1475, Jean de Montmirail, a native of Chaumont and a particular friend of pope Sixtus IV, obtained from him that each time the feast of St. John the Baptist fell on a Sunday, the faithful, who confessed their sins and visited the church of Chaumont, should enjoy the jubilee indulgence. Such was the origin of the great "Pardon" of Chaumont, celebrated sixty-one times between 1476 and 1905. At the end of the Middle Ages, this "Pardon" gave rise to certain curious festivities. Fifteen mysteries of the life of St. John the Baptist were represented on stages erected throughout the town on the Sunday preceding the "Pardon." The display drew multitudes to the festivities, which were finally called the "deviltries" of Chaumont. In the eighteenth century, the "Pardon" became a purely religious ceremony.

In the Diocese of Langres is Vassy, where, in 1562, riots took place between Catholics and Protestants that gave rise to the wars of religion (see Huguenots).

Numerous diocesan synods were held at Langres. The most important were those of 1404, 1421, 1621, 1628, 1679, 1725, 1733, 1741, 1783 and six successive annual synods held by Mgr. Parisis, from 1841 to 1846. These held a view to the re-establishment of the synodal organization, and also to impose on the clergy the use of the Roman Breviary (see Dom Guéranger).

Principal pilgrimages are Our Lady of Montrol near Arc-en-Barrois (dating from the seventeenth century); Our Lady of the Hermits at Cuves; Our Lady of Victories at Bourmont; and St. Joseph, Protector of the Souls in Purgatory, at Maranville.

Suppressed by the Napoleonic Concordat of 1801, Langres was later united to the Diocese of Dijon. The bishop bore the title of Dijon and Langres, but the union was never quite complete. There was a pro-vicar-general for the Haute-Marne and two seminaries at Langres, the petit séminaire from 1809 and the grand séminaire from 1817. The See of Langres was re-established in 1817 by Pope Pius VII and King Louis XVIII. Mgr. de la Luzerne, its pre-Revolution bishop, was to be re-appointed, but the parliament did not ratify this agreement and the bishops of Dijon remained administrators of the Diocese of Langres until 6 October 1822, when the Papal Bull "Paternae charitatis" definitely re-established the See. The new Bishop of Langres governed 360 parishes of the old Diocese of Langres, 70 of the old Diocese of Châlons, 13 of the old Diocese of Besançon, 13 of the old Diocese of Troyes and 94 of the old Diocese of Toul. For the legends concerning the Apostolic origin of the See of Langres and the mission of St. Benignus see Dijon.

Bishops 
The bishops, until 1016, resided at Dijon and until 1731, exercised spiritual jurisdiction over the territory of the present-day Diocese of Dijon. Following is a list of bishops of Langres.

To 1000
 c. 200 Sénateur
 c. 240 Juste
 c. 264 Desiderius (Didier, Dizier)
 Vacant
 284–301 Martin
 301–327 Honoratius
 327–375 Urban of Langres
 375–422 Paulin I
 St. Martin (411–420)?
 422–448 Fraterne I
 448–455 Fraterne II
 456–484 Apruncule, St. Aprunculus, the friend of Sidonius Apollinaris and his successor in the bishopric of Clermont
 485–490 Armentaire
 490–493 Venance
 493–498 Paulin II (Paul)
 498–501 Patient
 501–506 Albiso
 506–539 Gregory of Langres, St. Gregory (509–539), great-grandfather of St. Gregory of Tours, who transferred the relics of St. Benignus
 539–572 Tetricus of Langres, St. Tetricus, son of St. Gregory (539–572), whose coadjutor was St. Monderic, brother of Arnoul of Metz
 572–583 Papoul
 583–595 Mummole le Bon
 595–618 Miget (Migetius)
 618–628 Modoald
 628–650 Berthoald
 650–660 Sigoald
 660–670 Wulfrand
 670–680 Godin
 680–682 Adoin
 682–690 Garibald
 690–713 Héron
 713–742 Eustorge
 Died c. 759 Vaudier
 752–772 Erlolf
 772–778 Herulphe, Herulphus or Ariolf (759–774), founder of Ellwangen Abbey
 778–790 Baldric
 790–820 Belto, Betto (790–820), who helped to draw up the capitularies of Charlemagne
 820–838 Albéric
 838–856 Thibaut I
 859–880 Isaac, author of a collection of canons
 880–888 Gilon de Tournus
 888–890 Argrin, first time
 890–894 Thibaut II
 894–910 Argrin, second time
 910–922 Garnier I
 922–931 Gotzelin
 932 Lethéric
 932–948 Héric or Héry
 948–969 Achard
 969–980 Vidric
 980–1015 Bruno of Roucy who brought in the monks of Cluny to reform the abbeys of the diocese

1000–1300
 1016–1031 Lambert I, who ceded to Robert II of France the lordship and countship of Dijon, in 1016
 1031 Richard
 1031–1049 Hugo de Breteuil
 1050–1065 Harduin
 1065–1085 Raynard of Bar
 1085–1111 Robert of Burgundy
 1111–1113 Lambert II
 1113–1125 Joceran de Brancion
 1126–1136 Guillenc
 1136–1138 Guillaume I de Sabran
 1138–1163 Godefroy de la Roche Vanneau
 1163–1179 Walter of Burgundy, Gauthier of Burgundy
 1179–1193 Manasses of Bar
 1193–1199 Garnier II de Rochefort
 1200–1205 Hutin de Vandeuvre
 1205–1210 Robert de Châtillon
 1210–1220 Guillaume de Joinville († 1226) (Archbishop of Reims)
 1220–1236 Hugues de Montréal
 1236–1242 Robert de Torote († 1246), Prince-Bishop of Liège in 1240, and established the feast of the Blessed Sacrament, Elect of Châlon 1226
 1242–1250 Hugues de Rochecorbon
 1250–1266 Guy de Rochefort
 1266–1291 Guy de Genève
 1294–1305 Jean de Rochefort

1300–1500
 1305–1306 Bertrand de Got († 1313) (also Bishop of Agen), uncle of Clement V
 1306–1318 Guillaume de Durfort de Duras († 1330) (Archbishop of Rouen)
 1318–1324 Louis of Poitiers-Valentinois († 1327) (also Bishop of Viviers and Bishop of Metz)
 1324–1329 Pierre de Rochefort
 1329–1335 Jean de Chalon-Arlay (also Bishop of Basel)
 1335–1338 Guy Baudet (Chancellor of France)
 1338–1342 Jean des Prez († 1349) (Bishop of Tournai)
 1342–1344 Jean d'Arcy (Bishop of Autun)
 1344–1345 Hugues de Pomarc
 1345–1374 William of Poitiers
 1374–1395 Bernard de la Tour d'Auvergne
 1395–1413 Louis I of Bar (Administrator from 1397; also Bishop of Poitiers 1391–1392, 1423–1424, Bishop of Beauvais 1395, 1397 Cardinal Deacon of S. Agatha dei Goti, 1409 Cardinal Priest of SS. Dodici Apostoli, 1412 Cardinal Bishop of Porto and S. Rufina and Administrator of the Bishopric of Verdun 1413–1420, 1424–1430)
 1413–1433 Charles de Poitiers
 1433 Jean Gobillon († c. 1435)
 1433–1452 Philippe de Vienne
 1452–1453 Jean d'Aussy
 1453–1481 Guy Bernard
 1481–1497 Jean I d'Amboise
 1497–1512 Jean II d'Amboise

1500–1700
 1512–1529 Michel Boudet
 1530–1561 Claude de Longwy
 1562–1565 Louis de Bourbon
 1566–1568 Pierre de Gondi (also Bishop of Paris 1573–1588, Abbot of Saint-Aubin-d'Angers, La Chaume, Sainte-Croix de Quimperlé and Buzay)
 1569–1614 Charles de Perusse des Cars
 1615–1655 Sébastien Zamet, whose vicar-general, Charles de Condren, became later Superior General of the Oratorians and gave the college of Langres to the Society of Jesus in 1630
 1655–1670 Louis Barbier de La Rivière
 1671–1695 Louis Armand de Simiane de Gordes
 1696–1724 François-Louis de Clermont-Tonnerre

1700–1900
 1724–1733 Pierre de Pardaillan de Gondrin
 1741–1770 Gilbert Gaspard de Montmorin de Saint-Hérem
 1770–1802 César-Guillaume de La Luzerne
 1791–1802 Hubert Wandilincourt
 vacancy
 1817–1821 César-Guillaume de La Luzerne
 Gilbert-Paul Aragonès d'Orcet (1823–1832)
 Jacques-Marie-Adrien-Césaire Mathieu (1832–1834) (Archbishop of Besançon)
 Pierre-Louis Parisis (1834–1851) (Bishop of Arras), celebrated for the part he took in the Assembly of 1848 in the discussions on the liberty of teaching (liberté d'enseignement) and for founding the ecclesiastical college of St. Dizier even before the Loi Falloux (see Falloux du Coudray) was definitely passed
 Jean-Jacques-Marie-Antoine Guerrin (1851–1877)
 Guillaume-Marie-Frédéric Bouange (1877–1884)
 Alphonse-Martin Larue (1884–1899)
 Sébastien Herscher (1899–1911)

From 1900
 Marie-Augustin-Olivier de Durfort de Civbac de Lorge (1911–1918) (also Bishop of Poitiers)
 Théophile-Marie Louvard (1919–1924) (Bishop of Coutances)
 Jean-Baptiste Thomas (1925–1929)
 Louis-Joseph Fillon (1929–1934) (Archbishop of Bourges)
 Georges-Eugène-Emile Choquet (1935–1938) (Bishop of Tarbes and Lourdes)
 Firmin Lamy (1938–1939)
 Louis Chiron (1939–1964)
 Alfred-Joseph Atton (1964–1975)
 Lucien Daloz (1975–1980) (Archbishop of Besançon)
 Léon Aimé Taverdet, F.M.C. (1981–1999)
 Philippe Jean Marie Joseph Gueneley (1999–2014)
 Joseph de Metz-Noblat (since 2014)

See also
Catholic Church in France

References

Sources and external links
  Centre national des Archives de l'Église de France, L'Épiscopat francais depuis 1919, retrieved: 2016-12-24.
 

Roman Catholic dioceses in France
Haute-Marne
4th-century establishments in Roman Gaul